LibreOffice is a free and open-source office productivity software suite, a project of The Document Foundation (TDF). It was forked in 2010 from OpenOffice.org, an open-sourced version of the earlier StarOffice. The LibreOffice suite consists of programs for word processing, creating and editing of spreadsheets, slideshows, diagrams and drawings, working with databases, and composing mathematical formulae. It is available in 115 languages. TDF doesn't provide support for LibreOffice, but enterprised-focused editions are available from companies in the ecosystem.

LibreOffice uses the OpenDocument standard as its native file format, but supports formats of most other major office suites, including Microsoft Office, through a variety of import and export filters.

LibreOffice is available for a variety of computing platforms, with official support for Microsoft Windows, macOS and Linux and community builds for many other platforms. Ecosystem partner Collabora uses LibreOffice upstream code and provides apps for Android, iOS and ChromeOS. LibreOffice is the default office suite of most popular Linux distributions.

LibreOffice Online is an online office suite which includes the applications Writer, Calc and Impress and provides an upstream for projects such as commercial Collabora Online.

It is the most actively developed free and open-source office suite, with approximately 50 times the development activity of Apache OpenOffice, the other major descendant of OpenOffice.org, in 2015.

The project was announced and a beta released on 28 September 2010. In the nine months between January 2011 (the first stable release) and October 2011, LibreOffice was downloaded about 7.5 million times. In 2015, the project claimed 120 million unique downloading addresses from May 2011 to May 2015, excluding Linux distributions, with 55 million of those being from May 2014 to May 2015. The Document Foundation estimates that there are 200 million active LibreOffice users worldwide; approximately 25% are students and 10% are Linux users, who usually find LibreOffice part of their preferred distribution.

Features

Included applications

Operating systems and processor architectures 

LibreOffice is cross platform software. The Document Foundation developers target Microsoft Windows (IA-32 and x86-64), Linux (IA-32, x86-64 and ARM) and macOS (x86-64). There are community ports for FreeBSD, NetBSD, OpenBSD and Mac OS X 10.5 PowerPC receive support from contributors to those projects, respectively. LibreOffice is also installable on OpenIndiana via SFE.

Historically predecessors of LibreOffice, back to StarOffice 3, have run on Solaris with SPARC CPUs that Sun Microsystems (and later Oracle) made. Unofficial ports of LibreOffice, versions now obsolete, have supported SPARC. Current unofficial ports of LibreOffice 5.2.5 run only on Intel-compatible hardware, up to for Solaris 11.

In 2011, developers announced plans to port LibreOffice both to Android and to iOS. A beta version of a document viewer for Android 4.0 or newer was released in January 2015; In May 2015, LibreOffice Viewer for Android was released with basic editing capabilities. In February 2020, Collabora released its first officially supported version of LibreOffice (branded as Collabora Office) for Android and iOS. In July 2020 Collabora shipped an app, branded as Collabora Office, for ChromeOS, as used on the popular Chromebook line of notebook computers as well as other form factors of computers.

The LibreOffice Impress Remote application for various mobile operating systems allows for remote control of LibreOffice Impress presentations.

Table of cross platform support

LibreOffice Online 

LibreOffice Online is the online office suite edition of LibreOffice. It allows for the use of LibreOffice through a web browser by using the canvas element of HTML5. Development was announced at the first LibreOffice Conference in October 2011, and is ongoing. The Document Foundation, IceWarp, and Collabora announced a collaboration to work on its implementation. A version of the software was shown in a September 2015 conference, and the UK Crown Commercial Service announced an interest in using the software. On 15 December 2015, Collabora, in partnership with ownCloud, released a technical preview of LibreOffice Online branded as Collabora Online Development Edition (CODE). In July 2016 the enterprise version Collabora Online 1.0 was released. The same month, Nextcloud and Collabora partnered to bring CODE to Nextcloud users. By October 2016, Collabora had released nine updates to CODE. The first source code release of LibreOffice Online was done with LibreOffice version 5.3 in February 2017. In June 2019, CIB software GmbH officially announced its contributions to LibreOffice Online and "LibreOffice Online powered by CIB".

In October 2020 Collabora announced the move of its work on Collabora Online from The Document Foundation infrastructure to GitHub.

Comparison with OpenOffice 

A detailed 60-page report in June 2015 compared the progress of the LibreOffice project with the related project Apache OpenOffice. It showed that "OpenOffice received about 10% of the improvements LibreOffice did in the period of time studied."

Supported file formats 
As its native file format to save documents for all of its applications, LibreOffice uses the Open Document Format for Office Applications (ODF), or OpenDocument, an international standard developed jointly by the International Organization for Standardization (ISO) and the International Electrotechnical Commission (IEC). LibreOffice also supports the file formats of most other major office suites, including Microsoft Office, through a variety of import and export filters.

Miscellaneous features 

LibreOffice can use the GStreamer multimedia framework in Linux to render multimedia content such as videos in Impress and other programs.

Visually, LibreOffice used the large "Tango style" icons that are used for the application shortcuts, quick launch icons, icons for associated files and for the icons found on the toolbar of the LibreOffice programs in the past, and used on the toolbars and menus by default. They were later replaced by multiple icon themes to adapt the look and feel of specific desktop environment, such as Colibre for Windows, and Elementary for GNOME.

LibreOffice also ships with a modified theme which looks native on GTK-based Linux distributions. It also renders fonts via Cairo on Linux distributions; this means that text in LibreOffice is rendered the same as the rest of the Linux desktop.

With version 6.2, LibreOffice includes a ribbon-style GUI, called Notebookbar, including three different views.
This feature has formerly been included as an experimental feature in LibreOffice 6 (experimental features must be enabled from LibreOffice settings to make the option available in the View menu).

LibreOffice has a feature similar to WordArt called Fontwork.

LibreOffice uses HarfBuzz for complex text layout, it was first introduced in 4.1 for Linux and 5.3 for Windows and macOS. Fonts with OpenType, Apple Advanced Typography or SIL Graphite features can be switched by either a syntax in the Font Name input box or the Font Features dialog from the Character dialog.

LibreOffice supports a "hybrid PDF" format, a file in Portable Document Format (PDF) which can be read by any program supporting PDF, but also contains the source document in ODF format, editable in LibreOffice by dragging and dropping.

Licensing 

The LibreOffice project uses a dual LGPLv3 (or later) / MPL 2.0 license for new contributions to allow the license to be upgraded. Since the core of the OpenOffice.org codebase was donated to the Apache Software Foundation, there is an ongoing effort to get all the code rebased to ease future license updates. At the same time, there were complaints that IBM had not in fact released the Lotus Symphony code as open source, despite having claimed to. It was reported that some LibreOffice developers wanted to incorporate some code parts and bug fixes which IBM already fixed in their OpenOffice fork.

Scripting and extensions 

LibreOffice supports third-party extensions. , the LibreOffice Extension Repository lists more than 320 extensions. Another list is maintained by the Apache Software Foundation and another one by the Free Software Foundation. Extensions and scripts for LibreOffice can be written in C++, Java, CLI, Python, and LibreOffice Basic. Interpreters for the latter two are bundled with most LibreOffice installers, so no additional installation is needed. The application programming interface for LibreOffice is called "UNO" and is extensively documented.

LibreOffice Basic 

LibreOffice Basic is a programming language similar to Microsoft Visual Basic for Applications (VBA) but based on StarOffice Basic. It is available in Writer, Calc and Base. It is used to write small programs known as "macros", with each macro performing a different task, such as counting the words in a paragraph.

History

ooo-build, Go-oo and Oracle 

Members of the OpenOffice.org community who were not Sun Microsystems employees had wanted a more egalitarian form for the OpenOffice.org project for many years; Sun had stated in the original OpenOffice.org announcement in 2000 that the project would eventually be run by a neutral foundation and put forward a more detailed proposal in 2001.

Ximian and then Novell had maintained the ooo-build patch set, a project led by Michael Meeks, to make the build easier on Linux and due to the difficulty of getting contributions accepted upstream by Sun, even from corporate partners. It tracked the main line of development and was not intended to constitute a fork. It was also the standard build mechanism for OpenOffice.org in most Linux distributions and was contributed to by said distributions.

In 2007, ooo-build was made available by Novell as a software package called Go-oo (ooo-build had used the go-oo.org domain name as early as 2005), which included many features not included in upstream OpenOffice.org. Go-oo also encouraged outside contributions, with rules similar to those later adopted for LibreOffice.

Sun's contributions to OpenOffice.org had been declining for some time. They remained reluctant to accept contributions and contributors were upset at Sun releasing OpenOffice.org code to IBM for IBM Lotus Symphony under a proprietary contract, rather than under an open source licence.

Sun was purchased by Oracle Corporation in early 2010. OpenOffice.org community members were concerned by Oracle's behaviour towards open source software, specifically the Java lawsuit against Google and Oracle's withdrawal of developers, and lack of activity on or visible commitment to OpenOffice.org, as had been noted by industry observers – as Meeks put it in early September 2010, "The news from the Oracle OpenOffice conference was that there was no news." Discussion of a fork started soon after.

The Document Foundation and LibreOffice 
On 28 September 2010, The Document Foundation was announced as the host of LibreOffice, a new derivative of OpenOffice.org. The Document Foundation's initial announcement stated their concerns that Oracle would either discontinue OpenOffice.org, or place restrictions on it as an open source project, as it had on Sun's OpenSolaris.

LibreOffice 3.3 beta used the ooo-build build infrastructure and the OpenOffice.org 3.3 beta code from Oracle, then adding selected patches from Go-oo. Go-oo was discontinued in favour of LibreOffice. Since the office suite that was branded "OpenOffice.org" in most Linux distributions was in fact Go-oo, most moved immediately to LibreOffice.

Oracle was invited to become a member of The Document Foundation. However, Oracle demanded that all members of the OpenOffice.org Community Council involved with The Document Foundation step down from the OOo Community Council, claiming a conflict of interest.

Naming 

The name "LibreOffice" was picked after researching trademark databases and social media, as well as after checks were made to see if it could be used for URLs in various countries. Oracle rejected requests to donate the OpenOffice.org brand to the project.

LibreOffice was initially named BrOffice in Brazil. OpenOffice.org had been distributed as BrOffice.org by the BrOffice Centre of Excellence for Free Software because of a trademark issue.

End of OpenOffice.org and beginning of Apache OpenOffice 

Oracle announced in April 2011 that it was ending its development of OpenOffice.org and would lay off the majority of its paid developers. In June 2011, Oracle announced that it would donate the OpenOffice.org code and trademark to the Apache Software Foundation, where the project was accepted for a project incubation process within the foundation, thus becoming Apache OpenOffice. In an interview with LWN in May 2011, Ubuntu founder Mark Shuttleworth blamed The Document Foundation for destroying OpenOffice.org because it did not license its code under Oracle's Contributor License Agreement. In opposition to Shuttleworth's view, the former Sun executive Simon Phipps argued in the interview for the same online magazine, that the lay-off was an inevitable business decision by Oracle, not impacted by existence of LibreOffice.

In March 2015, an LWN.net comparison of LibreOffice with its cousin project Apache OpenOffice concluded that "LibreOffice has won the battle for developer participation".

Release history

Mascot competition 

In late 2017 The Document Foundation held a competition for the new mascot of LibreOffice. The mascot was to be used primarily by the community, and was not intended to supersede existing logos for the project. Over 300 concepts were submitted before the first evaluation phase.

The mascot contest was cancelled soon after new submissions stopped being accepted. The Document Foundation cited their lack of clear rules and arguments among community members as their reasoning for cancelling the contest.

Versions 
Since March 2014 and version 4.2.2, two different major "released" versions of LibreOffice are available at any time in addition to development versions (numbered release candidates and dated nightly builds). The versions are designated to signal their appropriateness for differing user requirements. Releases are designated by three numbers separated by dots. The first two numbers represent the major version (branch) number, and the final number indicates the bugfix releases made in that series. LibreOffice designates the two release versions as:

 "Fresh" – the most recent major version (branch), which contains the latest enhancements but which may have introduced bugs not present in the "still" release.
 "Still" (formerly "Stable") – the prior major version, which, by the time it has become the "still" version, has had around six months of bug fixing. It is recommended for users for whom stability is more important than the latest enhancements.

Release schedule 
LibreOffice uses a time-based release schedule for predictability, rather than a "when it's ready" schedule. New major versions are released around every six months, in January or February and July or August of each year. The initial intention was to release in March and September, to align with the schedule of other free software projects.
Minor bugfix versions of the "fresh" and "still" release branches are released frequently.

Enterprise support 
Commercially supported distributions for LibreOffice with service-level agreements are available via partners such as Collabora (marketed as Collabora Office and Collabora Online), CIB (marketed as CIB Office on the Microsoft Store), and Red Hat. The three vendors are major corporate contributors to the LibreOffice project.

As of version 7.1, the open source release of LibreOffice is officially branded as "LibreOffice Community", in order to emphasize that the releases are intended primarily for personal individual use, and are "not targeted at enterprises, and not optimized for their support needs". The Document Foundation states that usage of the community versions in such settings "has had a two-fold negative consequence for the project: a poor use of volunteers' time, as they have to spend their time to solve problems for business that provide nothing in return to the community, and a net loss for ecosystem companies."

Users and deployments 

The figure shows the worldwide number of LibreOffice users from 2011 to 2018 in millions. References are in the text.

2011: The Document Foundation estimated in September 2011, that there were 10 million users worldwide who had obtained LibreOffice via downloads or CD-ROMs. Over 90% of those were on Windows, with another 5% on OS X. LibreOffice is the default office suite for most Linux distributions, and is installed when the operating system is installed or updated. Based on International Data Corporation reckonings for new or updated Linux installations in 2011, The Document Foundation estimated a subtotal of 15 million Linux users. This gave a total estimated user base of 25 million users in 2011. In 2011, the Document Foundation set a target of 200 million users worldwide before the end of 2020.

2013: In September 2013, after two years, the estimated number of LibreOffice users was 75 million. A million new unique IP addresses check for downloads each week.

2015: In 2015, LibreOffice was used by 100 million users and 18 governments.

2016: In August 2016, the number of LibreOffice users was estimated at 120 million.

2018: The Document Foundation estimated in 2018 that there are 200 million active LibreOffice users worldwide. About 25% of them are students and 10% Linux users (who often automatically receive LibreOffice through their distribution). In comparison, Microsoft Office was used in 2018 by 1.2 billion users.

Mass deployments 
LibreOffice has seen various major deployments since its inception:

2003–2010
 In 2003–2004, the Brazilian corporation Serpro started migrating its software to BrOffice (the local version of LibreOffice at the time), with estimated value of BRL 3.5 million (approximately US$1.2 million at the time), and became a case study for similar initiatives in Brazil, particularly in e-government.
 In 2005, the French Gendarmerie announced its migration to OpenOffice.org. It planned to migrate 72,000 desktop machines to a customised version of Ubuntu (GendBuntu) with LibreOffice by 2015.
 In 2010, the Irish city of Limerick gradually started migrating to open-source solutions to free itself from vendor lock-in and improve its purchase negotiation power. One of the key aspects of this move has been the use of LibreOffice.

2011
 The administrative authority of the Île-de-France region (which includes the city of Paris) included LibreOffice in a USB flash drive given to students which contains free open-source software. The USB flash drive is given to approximately 800,000 students.
 It was announced that thirteen hospitals of the Copenhagen region would gradually switch to LibreOffice, affecting "almost all of the 25,000 workers".

2012
 The Greek city of Pylaia-Chortiatis migrated its PCs to use LibreOffice. The local Linux user group estimated cost savings to be at least €70,000.
 In July, the Spanish city of Las Palmas switched its 1,200 PCs to using LibreOffice, citing cost savings of €400,000.
 The administration of Umbria, Italy, started a project to migrate an initial group of 5,000 civil workers to LibreOffice.
 The city of Largo, Florida, US, has been a long-time user of open-source software using Linux thin clients. Originally using OpenOffice.org, the city switched to LibreOffice in 2013.

2013
 In August, the administration of the Spanish autonomous region of Valencia has completed the migration of all 120,000 PCs of the administration, including schools and courts, to LibreOffice.
 The German city of Munich announced that it would transition from OpenOffice to LibreOffice in the near future. This is in line with Munich's long-term commitment to using open-source software. Munich uses LiMux, an Ubuntu Linux derivative, on nearly all of the city's 15,000 computers. The city of Munich is the second public administration to join the advisory board at the Document Foundation. News appeared in 2014 that the council is considering migrating back to Microsoft Windows & Microsoft Office but was later denied. Based on a study, the mayor of Munich, Dieter Reiter, initiated the re-investigation of the scenario of migrating back to Microsoft systems. The trustworthiness of the study is questionable because the company has been "Microsoft's Alliance Partner of the Year" for nine years. Further details were issued by the Document Foundation.

2014
 The French city of Toulouse announced it saved €1 million by migrating thousands of workstations to LibreOffice.

2015
 The Italian Ministry of Defence announced that it would install LibreOffice on 150,000 PCs.
 The Italian city of Bari replaced Microsoft Office with LibreOffice on its 1,700 PCs.
 LibreOffice was officially made available for all UK Government agencies nationwide. Annual cost saving on a subscription for 6,500 users compared to MS Office is approximately £900,000.
 In July 2015, the IT project manager working for the administration of Nantes (France's sixth largest city) talked about the ongoing switch of its 5,000 workstations to LibreOffice started in 2013. According to the IT project manager, the switch to LibreOffice allowed the administration to save €1.7 million.
 As of 2015, LibreOffice is installed on almost all of the 500,000 workstations of the 11 French ministries members of the MIMO working group. The MIMO working group was the first public administration to join the advisory board at the Document Foundation.

2016
 The Taiwanese county of Yilan would purchase no more Microsoft Office licenses and turned to ODF and LibreOffice.
 The Vietnam Posts and Telecommunications Group switched all of its PCs (more than 15,000) to LibreOffice.
 Lithuanian police switched to LibreOffice on over 8,000 workstations, citing cost savings of €1 million.

2017
 The majority (75%) of municipalities in the Walloon region of Belgium use open source software and services which include LibreOffice. As of March 2017, over 20,000 public administration staff and many times more citizens use the services.
 The Spanish autonomous region of Galicia announced plans to finalize its switch to LibreOffice at several central government services and ministries, making LibreOffice the only office productivity suite on 6,000 workstations.
 The city of Rome, Italy, began installing LibreOffice on all of its 14,000 PC workstations, in parallel to the existing proprietary office suite. It is one of the planned steps to increase the city's use of free and open-source software, aiming to reduce lock-in to IT vendors.

2018
 Barcelona, Spain announced its transition to LibreOffice from Microsoft Office in January 2018. The change was part of a broader shift from proprietary to open-source software, and the city council aimed to eventually reach "full technological sovereignty" by eliminating its dependency on Microsoft products. During the announcement, Barcelona indicated that it would dedicate 70 percent of its software budget to open-source software.
 The city of Kahramanmaraş, Turkey, is migrating all of its PC workstations, around 2,000, to Pardus and LibreOffice.
 The city of Tirana, Albania, is finishing installing LibreOffice on all of the city's 1,000 PC workstations.

2019
 The city of Seixal, Portugal, migrated to LibreOffice on 1,100 workstations across all departments in Seixal City Hall.

2020
 The German state of Schleswig-Holstein wants to switch completely from Microsoft Office to LibreOffice by 2025 for its 25,000 employees. The transition will begin gradually in 2021.

2021
 Administration of several Russian nuclear power plants and subsidiaries of Rosatom are planning to switch to Astra Linux by the end of 2021, which includes LibreOffice; a total of 15,000 users.

Conferences 

Starting in 2011, The Document Foundation has organized the annual LibreOffice Conference, as follows:

 2011 – Paris, France – 12–15 October
 2012 – Berlin, Germany – 17–19 October
 2013 – Milan, Italy – 24–27 September
 2014 – Bern, Switzerland – 3–5 September
 2015 – Aarhus, Denmark – 23–25 September
 2016 – Brno, Czech Republic – 7–9 September
 2017 – Rome, Italy – 11–13 October
 2018 – Tirana, Albania – 26–28 September
 2019 – Almería, Spain – 11–13 September
 2020 – web conferencing – 15–17 October
 2021 – web conferencing – 23–25 September
 2022 – Milan, Italy & remotely (hybrid) – 28 September–1 October

Derivatives 

 Collabora Office and Collabora Online are enterprise-ready editions of LibreOffice. Most software development work on LibreOffice is by its commercial partners that includes Collabora, Red Hat and CIB/Allotropia, also providing long-term support, technical support, custom features, and Service Level Agreements (SLA)s.
EuroOffice is a derivative of LibreOffice with free and non-free extensions, for the Hungarian language and geographic detail, developed by Hungarian-based MultiRacio Ltd.
 "NDC ODF Application Tools" is a derivative of LibreOffice provided by the Taiwan National Development Council (NDC) and used by public agencies in Taiwan.
 NeoOffice 2017 and later versions are based on LibreOffice. Prior versions included stability fixes from LibreOffice, but were based on OpenOffice.
 OxOffice is a derivative of LibreOffice (originally a derivative of OpenOffice.org) with enhanced support for the Chinese language.
 OffiDocs is a derivative of LibreOffice online developed and supported by the OffiDocs Group OU with multiple applications to use LibreOffice in mobile apps.

See also 

 Comparison of office suites
 List of free and open-source software packages
 List of office suites
 OpenDocument file format

Notes

References

External links 

 

2011 software
Collabora
Cross-platform free software
Formerly proprietary software
Free and open-source software
Free PDF software
Free software programmed in C++
Free software programmed in Java (programming language)
LibreOffice
Office software that uses GTK
Office suites for macOS
Office suites for Windows
Online office suites
Online spreadsheets
Online word processors
Open-source office suites
OpenOffice
Portable software
Software forks
Software using the Mozilla license
Unix software